Mondim may refer to the following places in Portugal:

Mondim da Beira, civil parish in the municipality of Tarouca
Mondim de Basto, municipality in the district of Vila Real